The 1994–95 Montreal Canadiens season was the team's 86th season of play. For the first time since the 1969–70 season (and only the second time since 1947–48), the Canadiens failed to qualify for the Stanley Cup playoffs.

Off-season
In the 1994 NHL Entry Draft, the Canadiens selected defenceman Brad Brown with their first-round pick, 18th overall. The Canadiens were more fortunate with their second-round pick, selecting Jose Theodore 44th overall.

In August 1994, captain Guy Carbonneau was traded to the St. Louis Blues. Kirk Muller was named his replacement as captain.

Regular season
The season started later and was abbreviated by a lockout of the players by the NHL owners. The Canadiens played only 48 games. It was a forgettable season for the Canadiens and their fans, as the team missed the playoffs for the first time in 25 years. The Canadiens only won 3 of 24 games on the road. Already gone at the season's debut were members of the formidable 1992–93 Stanley Cup champion team, including Guy Carbonneau, Kevin Haller, Stephan Lebeau, and Denis Savard. On February 9, more players from the 1992–93 team departed, as Eric Desjardins, Gilbert Dionne, and John LeClair were traded to the Philadelphia Flyers in exchange for Mark Recchi. Another major trade nearly two months later on April 5 would send Craig Darby, Mathieu Schneider and fan favourite Kirk Muller to the New York Islanders in exchange for Vladimir Malakhov and Pierre Turgeon. The team subsequently named forward Mike Keane as its new captain. After a 7–5–4 start, Montreal won only 11 of its final 32 games, going 11–18–3. It was the first and only season of goaltender Patrick Roy's NHL playing career in which he lost more games than he won, and his only season of his NHL playing career that he did not make the playoffs.

The Canadiens tied the Florida Panthers and the Ottawa Senators for the fewest shorthanded goals scored during the regular season with one.

Final standings

Schedule and results

Player statistics

Regular season
Scoring

Goaltending

Transactions
 February 9, 1995: Montreal traded John LeClair, Eric Desjardins and Gilbert Dionne to the Philadelphia Flyers in exchange for Mark Recchi and Philadelphia's third-round pick in the 1995 NHL Entry Draft (used to select (Martin Hohenberger). LeClair gelled immediately with new Flyers line-mate Eric Lindros and quickly became one of the NHL's most feared goal-scorers.
 April 5, 1995: Montreal acquired Pierre Turgeon and Vladimir Malakhov from the New York Islanders in exchange for Kirk Muller, Mathieu Schneider and Craig Darby.

Draft picks

See also
 1994–95 NHL season

References
 Canadiens on Hockey Database
 Canadiens on NHL Reference

Montreal Canadiens seasons
Montreal Canadiens season, 1994-95
Montreal